Ophichthus fowleri, also known as the Fowler's snake eel is a species of eel in the family Ophichthidae. It is a marine eel which is known from the eastern Central Pacific in Hawaii.

References

Ophichthus
Taxa named by David Starr Jordan
Taxa named by Barton Warren Evermann
Fish described in 1903